The BvS10 (Bandvagn Skyddad 10) is a tracked articulated amphibious all-terrain armoured vehicle produced by BAE Systems Land Systems Hägglunds of Sweden.  This vehicle, referred to as the All Terrain Vehicle (protected) - ATV(P) or Viking by the UK forces, was originally developed as a collaboration between industry - Hägglunds Vehicle AB - and the British Ministry of Defence (MoD) on behalf of the Royal Marines.

The BvS10 is similar to, but distinct from, Hägglunds earlier Bandvagn 206 or Bv 206S. It is a much larger vehicle based upon the characteristic twin-cab, articulated frame-steering system typical of Hägglunds all-terrain vehicles. The main differences from the older Bv206s are a more powerful Cummins 5.9 litre diesel engine, improved ground clearance, and newly developed chassis, power train and steering units that give the vehicle considerably enhanced speed (up to 65 km/h from the previous 51.5 km/h on road) and comfort on road and in terrain, as well as greater load-carrying capability (up to 5 tons), and the ability to add various modular sub-systems such as add-on armour, weapon mounts, a load-changer and cargo platforms.

Operational history

Royal Marines
Originally designed for the British Royal Marines and named Viking, the vehicle underwent an extensive trials and development programme from 2001-2004, led by Major Jez Hermer  RM, before the Royal Marines accepted 108 vehicles into service, with delivery commencing in 2005. The Royal Marines Armoured Support Company took the vehicle on operations for the first time in Afghanistan in September 2006, prior to the Royal Marines Armoured Support Group being formed in December 2007.

UK variants
The UK currently operates four variants of the vehicle : The Troop Carrying Variant (TCV) capable of carrying 2 crew plus 10 passengers; the Command Variant (CV), which carries 2 crew plus up to 8 passengers with the rear cab being designed as an enhanced digital communications platform, the Repair and Recovery Variant (RRV), carrying 4 specialist maintenance vehicle mechanic crewmen and the Ambulance Variant (AV). The rear cab of the RRV carries a HIAB crane, a fully mobile workshop, an air compressor and a 9 tonne capacity capstan winch, together with hydraulic anchors.  All four variants are fully air-portable under a Boeing CH-47 Chinook helicopter, either complete or in two separate front and rear component parts and are also fully amphibious; being capable of swimming in varying sea-states with a full load of passengers and stores.

UK Viking vehicle variants are used as amphibious armoured all-terrain vehicles for troop transport and as vehicle repair recovery vehicles.

UK deployments
Some 33 British Vikings, fitted with slat armour, were deployed to Afghanistan at the end of summer 2006 when the Royal Marines relieved the Parachute Regiment in Helmand province. Their low ground pressure is not enough to trigger most of the anti-tank mines in use in Afghanistan, but they have proved vulnerable to improvised explosive devices (IEDs). Viking was subsequently upgraded with higher levels of Armour protection. Vikings were  complemented with the Singapore Technologies Kinetics (STK)  BRONCO known as Warthog within the UK military.

UK follow-on orders
In May 2007 the Ministry of Defence placed an order with BAE Hägglunds for a further 21 units, some of which are to be used as an equipment transporter for the new Thales Watchkeeper unmanned aerial vehicle.

Additionally on 26 June 2008 the MoD announced the purchase of an additional 14 Viking BvS10 vehicles at a cost of £14 million, including nine repair recovery vehicles, one command vehicle and four troop carriers, for deployment to Afghanistan. In January 2009, nine more vehicles were ordered.

Ninety-nine Vikings were revamped in a £37 million project, further  improving their firepower, armour and protection. This upgrade was due be completed in 2014 The upgrade was completed in April 2016.

Netherlands Marine Corps

The BvS10 is also in use with the Netherlands Marine Corps, 74 units have been delivered of which 46 are the APC version, 20 command vehicles, 4 repair and recovery vehicles and another 4 ambulance vehicles.

Dutch deployments
On 27 March 2008 the Dutch Parliament decided in favour of sending a 60-men strong Marine reconnaissance unit to Chad in support of the EUFOR peacekeeping mission in the region. The marines functioned as the eyes and ears of an Irish battalion. This was the first operational deployment of the BvS10 Viking in Dutch service after exercises in Norway and the UK.

As part of the Dutch ISAF contribution, a Royal Netherlands Marine Corps company has been deployed to the province of Uruzgan in Afghanistan since July 2009. Several BvS10 Vikings have been modified with slat armour for this mission.

Variants

Beowulf
Unarmoured version of the BvS10, with a new cabin.
It carries up to 14 people or 8 tons of cargo with a top speed of 65 km/h, and like the Viking is fully amphibious without special preparations.

Sales

French order

On 18 December 2009, the French Armed Forces placed an initial order for 53 BvS10 Vikings, with the total order for 129 of the vehicles.  Including servicing, the contract is estimated to be worth £220 million, and the vehicles will be assembled at the BAE factory in Sweden.  This is a historic order, as it is the first French order for military equipment from the United Kingdom in decades.  In placing the order, France broke with their tradition of supporting domestic products, in this case the Bronco All Terrain Tracked Carrier, built jointly by ST Kinetics and Thales.

Swedish order

On 5 January 2012, it was announced that the Swedish Armed Forces decided to procure 48 units of the model BvS10 MkIIB under the designation Bv410, to be delivered starting in the autumn of 2012, and deployed to the Swedish contingent in Afghanistan in the spring of 2013. The contract is worth approximately 700 million SEK, and also includes support and training equipment. There are also options to order an additional 127 vehicles divided in three different batches in the future.

On 25 September 2013, Sweden agreed to buy 105 additional BvS10 vehicles for over $160 million, as part of the options agreed upon in the first order. On 19 December 2013, Sweden officially ordered 105 BvS10 vehicles for $120 million.  The vehicles include troop carrier, command, ambulance, and logistic carrier variants and will be delivered from 2014 to 2015.

In 2019, Sweden began fielding the Eldenhet 98 surface-to-air missile mounted on the Bv410 platform as a replacement for the obsolete RBS 70.

On 3 May 2021, BAE Systems signed a contract worth around $200 million to produce and deliver 127 BvS10 all-terrain vehicles to the Swedish Army, adding to its existing fleet of BvS10s. The contract signed with the Swedish military procurement agency, FMV, is for both command and control and logistics vehicles. Deliveries of the 127 vehicles are planned to begin in 2022 and complete in 2024, in 2022 A $50m follow-on order for 40 was placed while a further 236 where ordered under the CATV program.

Austrian order
On 30 June 2016, it was announced on the BAE Systems website that the Austrian Army decided to procure 32 units of the model BvS10, to be delivered from 2017 to 2018. The BvS10 will also play a role in Austria's mission in the European Union Mountain Training Warfare Initiative (EU MTI).

According to the Austrian military magazine "Truppendienst", the Austrian Army will receive the first build BvS10's MkIIB with CBRN protection and all vehicles equipped with WS4 PANTHER remote controlled weapon station. A possible additional BvS10 MkIIB order could be signed after 2018 delivery.

The Austrians received the first of their BvS10 vehicles in February 2019.

United States order
On 22 August 2022, BAE Systems and Department of Defense announced a $278 Million dollar fixed-price contract including spare parts and contractor logistics support to procure 163 vehicles delivered by 2029 for the US Army Cold Weather All-Terrain Vehicle (CATV) program. The CATV will utilize components from US suppliers for its engines, transmission, and hydraulics. The Beowulf will replace the current BV206 based Small Unit Support Vehicles (SUSV) from BAE Systems Hägglunds in use by the US Army since the 1980s.

Collaborative All-Terrain Vehicle (CATV)
On 23 November 2022, Sweden gave notice on the direct award of a £600m framework order for an initial 436 units of an improved BV410 model with higher mine protection and load capacity for use as troop transport, logistics and communication. It will be procured in five national variants 236 on behalf of Sweden, 140 for Germany and 60 for the United Kingdom with the option to extend the contract to include further countries or orders.

Operators

 : 32 in use with the Austrian Army. Ordered in July 2016, first vehicles delivered in February 2019.
 : 53 BvS10 in use with the French Army.
 : 73 BvS10 in use with the Netherlands Marine Corps.
 : 153 BvS10 MkII in use with the Swedish Army. New order in 2021 for 127 BvS10 vehicles with a 2022 follow-on order for 40 and 236 under the CATV program.
 : 99 BvS-10 Mk2 in use with the Royal Marines. 60 ordered under the CATV program to be delivered from 2024 onwards.

Future operators 
 : The Canadian Army is currently tendering the purchase of 100 vehicles under the Domestic Arctic Mobility Enhancement for delivery from 2029-2030.
 : 136 Beowulf model to be delivered by 2029.
 : 140 CATV ordered with delivery commencing 2024.

See also
Vehicles similar to the BvS10 ATV include:

 (Ishimbai Transport Machine-Building Plant) Vityaz
 Sisu Auto Sisu Nasu
 ST Kinetics Bronco All Terrain Tracked Carrier
 Hägglunds (BAE Systems AB) Bv206
 Bandvagn 202

References

External links

Viking BVS10
Viking (BvS10)Project Details on Deagel.com
Manufacturer's website

Amphibious military vehicles
Tracked amphibious vehicles
Tracked military vehicles
Snowmobiles
Military vehicles of Sweden
Armoured fighting vehicles of the United Kingdom
Two-section tracked all-terrain vehicles
Military vehicles introduced in the 2000s